Papilio dravidarum, the Malabar raven, is an endemic species of swallowtail butterfly found in the Western Ghats of India.

Description
The Malabar raven is a blackish-brown tailless swallowtail butterfly, about 80 to 100 mm in size. Both the sexes are similar and are mimics of the unpalatable common crow (Euploea core). The upper forewing has a small white spot at the end of the cell, a complete series of equal sized marginal white spots in regular row and a terminal series of spots decreasing in size towards the apex. The upper hindwing has a discal series of arrow shaped white spots. It also has a submarginal series of elongated white crescent shaped markings. There is a white fringe between the veins. The outer halves of wings have a dusting of yellowish brown scales.

Range
It is endemic to the Western Ghats in South India where it occurs in the states of Kerala, Tamil Nadu, Karnataka and Goa.

Status
The butterfly is uncommon but not known to be threatened. It was commonest in Wynaad and Coorg in the past and rarer towards the extremities of its range.

Habitat
It has been recorded in January and from March to October.

Habits

The Malabar raven resembles the model common crow in habits and flight, but is faster than the other mimic, the common mime. It prefers shady patches. The males drink at wet patches especially in the hot dry pre-monsoon days.

Life cycle
There are two to three broods a year. It is recorded in Coorg as having broods from September to October, November to December, and, from April to May. It has been recorded in Karnataka in July and in September. Males appear to outnumber the females.

Food plants
 Glycosmis pentaphylla of the family Rutaceae. Others that have been noted include Clausena heptaphylla.

Systematics
Papilio dravidarum is a member of the castor species group. The clade members are:
Papilio castor Westwood, 1842
Papilio dravidarum Wood-Mason, 1880
Papilio mahadeva Moore, [1879]

See also
Papilionidae
List of butterflies of India (Papilionidae)

References

Other sources

External links

Butterfly Corner Images from Naturhistorisches Museum Wien

dravidarum
Butterflies of Asia
Butterflies described in 1880
Endemic fauna of the Western Ghats
Taxa named by James Wood-Mason